The 35th Curtis Cup Match was played from 30 May to 1 June 2008 on the Old Course at St Andrews, Scotland. The United States won 13 to 7. This was the first Curtis Cup played over three days, including fourball matches for the first time. Stacy Lewis won all her five matches.

Format
The contest was a three-day competition, with three foursomes and three fourball matches on each of the first two days, and eight singles matches on the final day, a total of 20 points.

Each of the 20 matches is worth one point in the larger team competition. If a match is all square after the 18th hole extra holes are not played. Rather, each side earns  a point toward their team total. The team that accumulates at least 10 points wins the competition. In the event of a tie, the current holder retains the Cup.

Teams
Eight players for the Great Britain & Ireland and USA participated in the event plus one non-playing captain for each team.

The Great Britain & Ireland team was selected by the LGU in March 2008.

The American team was selected by the USGA's International Team Selection Committee in January 2008.

Friday's matches

Morning foursomes

Afternoon fourballs

Saturday's matches

Morning foursomes

Afternoon fourballs

Sunday's singles matches

References

External links
Official site
USGA archive
2008 Curtis Cup (about.sports)

Curtis Cup
Golf tournaments in Scotland
International sports competitions hosted by Scotland
Sport in Fife
Curtis Cup
Curtis Cup
Curtis Cup
Curtis Cup